Vision TV Network is a television channel distribution service provided by Vision247 Ltd in the United Kingdom. The service carries around 35 channels in English and other languages, streamed from the internet and accessed via Freeview channel 264, EE TV boxes, mobile apps or the web.

History 
When Vision TV was launched in 2012, it provided viewers in the UK with access to a package of foreign TV channels. Viewers had to subscribe online in order to watch pay TV channels on the Vision TV Network, which were delivered through data channels (110, 111 and 112) on Freeview HD set-top boxes, and later to Roku players. As an IPTV service, the network also allowed two-way interactivity to enable functionality such as voting, commerce and targeted advertising.

The service initially broadcast French, Greek, Polish and Turkish channels. In August 2012, Muslim and Arabic-language channels were added. In March 2015, a Portuguese package called 'My Portuguese' was added, which included Benfica TV. In September 2015 the service became available on the web, as well as EETV set-top boxes. In November 2015, iOS and Android apps were launched.

The UK pay-TV service closed down on 30 April 2019 and was no longer available on Roku or mobile devices, though a separate package of free channels continued to stream online and via Freeview.

Visiontv. on Freeview

In addition to the subscription package of foreign language television channels on Roku/Now TV and Android devices, Vision247 launched a second service via Freeview channel 264. Now branded as VisionTV (styled as Visiontv.), this free-to-view streaming service features a number of English-language channels with news and religious programming from around the world.

At the end of 2020, Visiontv. launched their own channel VTC (Vision TV Channel, styled as vtc. ) as part of their entertainment channels line-up and added Newsmax TV and Syria TV to their news channels.

Vision247 and Mondo Globo on Freeview
As well as their own streaming portal, Vision247 Limited has teamed up with Canadian firm Mondo Globo to secure a more permanent channel position in the streaming area of Freeview for a number of Arabic channels. This has included a slot on Freeview channel 272 for Asharq News and channel 273 for MBC's Al Arabiya and Al Hadath services.

Freeview channel line-up

The channel line-up, as of October 2022, on the Freeview visiontv. streaming service is as follows:
Arise News
Arise Play (formally Live360)
Al Araby Television
Al Araby2
Best Direct
Brit Asia TV (An ex-Channelbox service)
British Muslim TV
Channel 7 (formally GNTV)
Daystar
DW English
 Edgy TV (broadcasting programmes from FTV.com)
eSports24.tv
 Faith World TV
France 24 French (also broadcasting via Channelbox) 
Good News TV
Islam Channel
 Iran International
JML
Newsmax
NTAI
Propeller TV 
Revelation
Sharjah TV
Sikh Channel
SportyStuffTV
Supreme Master TV.com
 Syria TV
 Sum TV
That's TV (only available via Vision TV on Freeview ch264, not through their website or app)
3ABN (broadcasting a number of separate channels for different languages: Dare to Dream, 3ABN, 3ABN Latino, 3ABN Proclaim!, 3ABN Français, 3ABN Kids, 3ABN Praise Him Music, 3ABN Russia,)
TJC (The Jewellery Channel) 
UK44

Former channels
These channels have left their Freeview line-up, as of October 2022:

SinoTV 
Urdu1  
Glory TV
Firstlight TV 
France 24 English (replaced by the French language version on 20 October 2022)
Jesus Sanctuary
Peace TV
Peace TV Urdu
Iqra TV
Iqra TV Bangla 
Hellenic TV 1 (now broadcasts via Channelbox)
HudaTV
Spotlight TV (moved to Channelbox and now known as Music & Memories)
YANGA!
FashionTV (the main FTV.com channel, now broadcasting via Channelbox)
Sports Tonight
CGTN (previously available on Vision TV platform under the name CCTV News) 
ABP News
Times Now
Firstlight
Dunamis TV
IIPC TV

Company structure 
Vision247 is a private limited company, established as Vision IPTV Ltd in 2006 and renamed in 2013. Its sole director is Nduka Obaigbena, who has Nigerian nationality. There were 19 employees in 2019.

References

External links

Television channels in the United Kingdom
Television channels and stations established in 2012
2012 establishments in the United Kingdom